Haratch is an Armenian word for "forward". It may refer to:

Haratch, long-running French Armenian daily publication in Paris (1925–2009)
Haratch, publication of the Armenian Revolutionary Federation in Tbilisi, Georgia (1906–1909) - See media section of Armenians in Georgia
Haratch (weekly), Lebanese Armenian Communist publication (1958–1970)
Nor Haratch, French Armenian periodical newspaper published in Paris starting 2009

See also
"Haratch", the St. Catharines, Ontario, Canada chapter of the Armenian Youth Federation
 Haratch Calouste Gulbenkian Secondary School, in Anjar, Lebanon